Gundam War: Mobile Suit Gundam the Card Game also known simply as Gundam War is an out-of-print collectible card game based on the Gundam anime series produced by Bandai.  Players can simulate battles in the anime series.  The game is designed for 2 players, though there may be different fan-created multiplayer rules.  This game is sometimes confused with the Gundam M.S. War Trading Card Game, since both are published by Bandai and are based on the Gundam series.

History

Gundam War is a collectible card game based on the Gundam anime series.  It was first released in Japan in February 1999, and later a Traditional Chinese version and an English version was released in early 2005.  The English version of the game was discontinued after three sets.  The Japanese version of the game was discontinued in 2018, after 45 sets.

Gameplay

Each player starts with a deck, called the "Nation Pile", which has exactly 50 cards.  Players take turns drawing from their Nation Pile at the beginning of their turn, except the very first turn of the game.  They battle against each other with Unit cards that they control, with excess damage sending proportionate numbers of cards, along with any discarded cards, to the "Discard Pile".  When a player has depleted his/her Nation, s/he has lost the game.  There are six different colors of cards, representing different factions of various series, and five different types of cards.

Colors and Factions

In the Japanese card game, the following are the six colors and their related factions.

Blue:
This color is generally effective at quick production, defense, and recovery.  (Similar to White in Magic: the Gathering)  This color includes many of the protagonists and their respective factions from Universal Century, which includes:
Earth Federation (Gundam), and its related force (excluding forces related to Titans)
AEUG of Mobile Suit Zeta Gundam and Mobile Suit Gundam ZZ
Londo Bell of Char's Counterattack
League Militaire of Mobile Suit Victory Gundam

Green:
This color is known for damaging effects from Command cards, and low-cost Units.  (Similar to Red in Magic: the Gathering)  The factions included in this color include, but are not limited to:
Zeon of Mobile Suit Gundam
Delaz Fleet of Gundam 0083
Oldsmobile of Mobile Suit Gundam F90
All cards from Mobile Suit Gundam 00 aside from Celestial Being

Black:
This color is known for effects that affect all cards on the field, direct removal of cards, and large-scale effects at a cost. (Similar to Black in Magic: the Gathering)  The factions include in this color include:
Titans of Mobile Suit Zeta Gundam
New Desides of Gundam Sentinel
Zanscare Empire of Mobile Suit Victory Gundam
Units in Mobile Suit Gundam 00 aside from animation (other than partial units from Celestial Being).

Red:
Particularly specializing in negation of the opponent's card effects, (Similar to Blue in Magic: the Gathering) the factions included in this color are:
Axis/Neo Zeon of Mobile Suit Zeta Gundam, Mobile Suit Gundam ZZ, and Char's Counterattack
Crossbone Vanguard of Gundam F91 and Crossbone Gundam
Jupiter Empire from Crossbone Gundam
Mafty of Hathaway's Flash

Brown:
This color is previously known for effects that affect the Discard Pile and Junkyard. After the participation of G Gundam. also its unique attacking style of the Mobile Fighters. The factions include in this color include:
All cards from Turn A Gundam
All cards from After War Gundam X
All cards from Mobile Fighter G Gundam

White:
This color is known for their high-cost-high-powered Unit cards and the variations of Command cards. The factions include in this color include:
All cards from Mobile Suit Gundam Wing series
All cards from Mobile Suit Gundam SEED series

Purple:
This color is divided into two types, although both types are known as having high flexibility that can used in any decks, but since the introduction of Mobile Suit Gundam 00, the nature of purple has been switched, currently it is divided into two types:
-The first purple type is card can be played, regardless of current color generation. Some of the most powerful cards in the game belong to this color. These types of card are similar to Artifact cards in Magic: the Gathering.
Neutral forces in any Gundam series, or mobile supporting weapons.
Mobile weapons that belongs to no timeline, like Perfect Gundam.
Some famous scenes in Gundam series that may, or may not, belongs to a single series.
-The second type needs purple generation (or without them but with harsh conditions) and a different generation to play it, it provides high flexibility, high power and high tactical variations through having tougher requirement. The factions include in this color include:
Celestial Being in Mobile Suit Gundam 00.
All cards from Mobile Suit Gundam AGE series

It is noted that cards from the SD Gundam series may belong to any of the colours, currently at least one SD Gundam Units exists in Blue, White, and Purple.

Also, there is a new card called "Dual Cards".  This type of card has two specific colors as its cost. They represent moves involving more than one force in the animations. However, even not involved by more than one force, units from A-Laws and Celestial Being, are mostly in dual. Those cards needs two different generations (or even three) to play, some of the units might need one designated color (Green or Black).

Unit cards

Unit cards are the representations of the Mobile Suits, Mobile Armors, Cruisers, and Colonies in the anime series.  They are the main ways to battle and deal damage to the opponent's Nation, as they are the only type of cards that can enter into the Battle Area.  Only one Unit card can be played per turn.

Character cards

Character cards are the representations of the characters in the anime series.  They are set onto a Unit and bring extra effects and battle modifications to the Set-On Unit, through there are characters that can be set onto other types of cards.  Only one Character card can be played per turn, and no two characters with the same name can be in play by either player at any one time.

Command cards

Command cards are cards that carry out effects, usually depicting scenes in the anime series.  Commands go to the Junkyard after their resolution.  There is no limit to the Command cards that can be played per turn, providing the text on the card permits it.

This type of card is similar to Instant and Sorcery cards in the Magic: the Gathering game.

Operation cards

Operation cards remain in play, usually affecting the game state, or capable of activating an effect at any time.  They also depict their respective event or battle in the anime series.  Only one Operation card can be played per turn. Some operation card are needed to set on the other designated cards rather than on the play area.

This type of card is similar to Enchantment in the Magic: the Gathering game.

Generation cards

This type of card produces a "Nation Power" (similar to Mana in many other card games) that one can use to play other cards.  There are two types of this card: "Basic G" cards and "Special G" cards. Generation cards usually depict resources, soldiers, and supporters in the anime series.

Basic Generation cards usually have effects of "Producing a NP for certain color", and one can have any amount of it in a deck, while Special Generation cards have diverse effects and a maximum of 6 special Generation of the same name can be put into a deck.

This is similar to Land cards in Magic: the Gathering.

Balance Controls

Unlike the Yu-Gi-Oh or Magic: The Gathering, Gundam War has little effect on after-market meta balances. No limits are placed on the types of booster packs that can be used in most general games (including all games in Grand Tournaments). The method they mainly use is to make new cards that have the ability to suppress older powerful decks. Old cards are uncommon to see in play other than cards with draw-search purposes.

The early stages of Gundam War do not enforce any card restrictions other than some minor erratas. The first major adjustments involving banned cards occurred after the Grand Tournament in 2005 where deck diversity was reduced too much due to the appearance of a few type overpowered decks which greatly reduce the game time. Until August 2008. There are 17 limited cards and 15 official banned cards.

The most commonly banned combos in Gundam War history summon a large number (three or more) of untapped strong units in a single turn in early stages (earlier than the time unit that can be normally paid) and strike to the opponent before s/he can make defenses. Whenever such combo appears in many places in tournaments, usually one or a few key cards will be banned/limited afterward, for more serious cases, the ability of the cards/skills will be changed to outlaw the combo decks. The "quick" ability (especially with untap ability) was another type of cards that is the main target of target control, as "quick" originally did not count as a limit of cards that can be paid in a single turn. The "quick lands" were banned in early 2008, and the "quick" rule was amended in August 2008. Cards with quick ability are also counted as card-paying limits; they can no longer played all at once in a single turn. The remaining type of limited card related to destroying lands, which will give a great disadvantage to multi-color decks, especially decks having Celestial Being's unit.

Releases

Japan
The largest release and most expansions have been delivered into the Japanese market. Gundam War made its debut in February 1999 with 200 different cards. The first expansion set was released in June 1999, adding another 100 cards. Mobile Suit Gundam The 08MS Platoon and ∀ Gundam cards were released in a 49 card special set in September 1999. Another expansion in October 1999 would add another 130 cards. In February 2000, another set containing Mobile Suit Gundam 0083 was released adding another 204 cards to the game. In June 2000, 80 cards were released which debuted Gundam W. In August 2000, another set adding 224 more cards were released. In December 2000, cards featuring Mobile Suit Gundam 0080 were released in a 66 card set. In February 2001, another 224 card set was released. In April 2001, a 108 card set featuring Mobile Suit Gundam F91 and Mobile Suit Gundam V debuted. In August 2001, another expansion set containing 220 cards was released. In November 2001, a new set containing 240 cards with 84 new cards was released, including cards featuring "Mobile Suit Gundam: Char's Counterattack". February 2002 saw another 207 card set. Gundam War CCG was discontinued in Japan in 2018.

Tournaments
In 2013 Taiwan's official website for Gundam War continued to list sanctioned tournaments for players in the Gundam NEX-A format with various tournaments. The Taiwan tournaments used errata that were unchanged since 2002, with the rulebook being based on the 2001 Japanese rules.

Reception
Anime Fringe magazine  reviewed the game Gundam: MS WAR which was a separate game from the other US released Gundam War, back in 2001 and criticized its appearances, illogical and unfinished rules that need to be worked out to play the game and called it a blatant cash grab from Bandai.

References

Links
Official Japanese Bandai Gundam War Page
Baron's Gundam War Comet, a known English GW fan-site with Japanese cards translation
Japanese Gundam War Wiki

Card games introduced in 1999
Collectible card games
Gundam